Michael Steven Kapla (born September 19, 1994) is an American professional ice hockey defenseman who is currently playing for Rögle BK in the Swedish Hockey League (SHL).

Playing career
After graduating from Eau Claire Memorial High School and going undrafted in the NHL Entry Draft, Kapla played collegiate hockey with University of Massachusetts Lowell of the Hockey East. In his freshman season, Kapla played in 41 games and was named to the 2014 Hockey East All-Rookie Team.

Prior to his junior year, Kapla was named team captain. As the River Hawks played in the Three Rivers Classic, Kapla was named to the All-Tournament Team although UMass Lowell lost to Robert Morris 5–3 in the final game. He collected two assists in the opening round of the tournament.

At the conclusion his senior year, and second as captain, with the River Hawks in the 2016–17 season, Kapla was signed to a two-year, entry-level contract with the New Jersey Devils on March 28, 2017. 
Kapla ended his collegiate career playing in 161 consecutive games, the most in UMass Lowell program history. Kapla immediately embarked on his professional career, burning one of his contract years in joining the Devils to play out the remainder of the 2016–17 season. He made his NHL debut, paired alongside veteran Ben Lovejoy, in a 2–1 defeat to the New York Islanders on March 31, 2017.

As a restricted free agent at the end of the 2017–18 season, he accepted a one year, two way qualifying offer from the Devils.

In the following 2018–19 season, Kapla was assigned to continue in the AHL with the Binghamton Devils. He appeared in 45 games for 16 points with Binghamton before on January 30, 2019, the Devils traded Kapla to the Minnesota Wild in exchange for Ryan Murphy.

On June 25, 2019, Kapla was not tendered a qualifying offer by the Wild, releasing him to free agency. Kapla continued his professional career in the AHL, securing a one-year contract with the Toronto Marlies on July 18, 2019. Kapla was re-assigned to begin the 2019–20 season in the ECHL with secondary affiliate the Newfoundland Growlers. He was later recalled to the Marlies, posting 6 points through 14 games, before the season was cancelled die to the COVID-19 pandemic.

On May 15, 2020, Kapla as a free agent opted to pursue a European career, agreeing to a one-year contract with Swedish second division club, Västerviks IK of the Allsvenskan.

Personal life
Kapla is one of three children born to Mary and Steven Kapla in Eau Claire, Wisconsin.

Career statistics

Awards and honors

References

External links

1994 births
Living people
American men's ice hockey defensemen
Binghamton Devils players
Ice hockey players from Wisconsin
Iowa Wild players
New Jersey Devils players
Newfoundland Growlers players
Rögle BK players
Skellefteå AIK players
Sportspeople from Eau Claire, Wisconsin
Sioux City Musketeers players
Toronto Marlies players
Undrafted National Hockey League players
UMass Lowell River Hawks men's ice hockey players
Västerviks IK players